Ministry for Internal Affairs of Chuvashia (Министерство внутренних дел по Кабардино-Балкарской Республике) is the official name of the Kabardino-Balkaria's Police.

Subordinated directly to the Russian Interior Ministry and the President of Kabardino-Balkaria. Current local minister is 
Sergey Vasiliev (Since November 15, 2010).

The  Main Headquarters is in embattled Nalchik City.

Territorial Structure
Nalchik City Police Department (Управление МВД России по г. Нальчик)
Prokhladnsk Region Police Department (Отдел МВД России по Прохладненскому району)
Prokhladniy City Police Department (Отдел МВД России по г. Прохладный)
 Elbrus Region Police Department (Отдел МВД России по Эльбрусскому району)
 Baksanskiy Municipal Police Department (Межмуниципальный отдел МВД России "Баксанский")
Zolsk Region Police Department (Отдел МВД России по Зольскому району)
May Region Police Department (Отдел МВД России по Майскому району)
Tersk Region Police Department (Отдел МВД России по Терскому району)
Urvan Region Police Department (Отдел МВД России по Урванскому району)
Chegem Region Police Department (Отдел МВД России по Чегемскому району)
Lesken Region Police Department (Отдел МВД России по Лескенскому району)
Chereksk Region Police Department (Отдел МВД России по Черекскому району)
Traffic Police (УГИБДД МВД по Кабардино-Балкарской Республике)

External links
Official Homepage
Traffic Police

Politics of Kabardino-Balkaria
Kabardino-Balkaria
Kabardino-Balkaria